is a Tokyo, Japan based manufacturer of measurement equipment such as digital blood pressure monitors, scales for medical and home use, ultrasonic nebulizers, as well as analog-to-digital and digital-to-analog converters for semiconductor manufacturing equipment and electron guns.  "A&D" stands for "analog and digital" and is represented without any spaces (i.e. "A&D" as opposed to "A & D".)

It was founded in 1977 by a group of 13 engineers who left Takeda Riken Industry Co., Ltd. (currently Advantest) in Japan and was first listed on the Tokyo Stock Exchange in March 2006 as symbol 7745.

References 

Laboratory equipment manufacturers
Manufacturing companies based in Tokyo
Medical technology companies of Japan
Technology companies established in 1977
Japanese brands